John Lunn Newman (1916-1976) was a male athlete who competed for England.

Athletics career
Newman represented England in the high jump at the 1938 British Empire Games in Sydney, New South Wales, Australia.

Personal life
He was a bank clerk by trade and lived in Landon Road, Rochester during 1938.

References

1916 births
1976 deaths
English male high jumpers
Athletes (track and field) at the 1938 British Empire Games
Commonwealth Games competitors for England